The 1881 Columbia football team represented Columbia University in the 1881 college football season.

Schedule

References

Columbia
Columbia Lions football seasons
Columbia football